Eliza Anna Grier (1864–1902) was an American physician and the first African-American woman licensed to practice medicine in the U.S. state of Georgia.

Biography
Dr. Eliza Anna Grier was born in Mecklenburg County, North Carolina in 1864 to Emily and George Washington Grier. Although she was born after the Emancipation Proclamation, she was effectively a slave in that part of North Carolina not occupied by the Union Army. She was emancipated in practice at the end of the war (while still an infant) and later moved to Nashville, Tennessee to study teaching at Fisk University. In order to be able to afford her tuition fees, she alternated every year of studying with working; after enrolling in 1884, she graduated in 1891.

Grier wrote to the Woman's Medical College of Pennsylvania in 1890 to explain that she had very little money and inquired whether assistance "might be provided for an emancipated slave to receive any help into so lofty a profession".  She was accepted into the college in 1893 and once again worked in between periods of studying to support herself.  Eliza worked for a year picking cotton to pay for the next year's medical school, taking her seven years to graduate.

After graduating in 1897, she moved to Atlanta, Georgia and applied for a license to practice medicine in Fulton County, making her the first African-American woman to receive a medical license in the state of Georgia. Grier set up a private practice in Atlanta, specializing in obstetrics and gynecology.

She was quoted as saying "When I saw colored women doing all the work in cases of accouchement [childbirth], and all the fee going to some white doctor who merely looked on, I asked myself why should I not get the fee myself. For this purpose I have qualified. I went to Philadelphia, studied medicine hard, procured my degree, and have come back to Atlanta, where I have lived all my life, to practice my profession. Some of the best white doctors in the city have welcomed me, and say that they will give me an even chance in the profession. That is all I ask."

During this time, she also supplemented her income with teaching jobs. She fell ill in 1901, just three years after opening her practice, and was unable to work. She wrote to suffragist Susan B. Anthony to request help with her financial troubles.

Anthony was not in a position to help her financially but did contact Woman's Medical College on her behalf.

She moved to Albany, Georgia, where her brother Richard Edgar Grier, also a physician, worked. She died in 1902, just five years after beginning to practice medicine, and was buried in Charlotte, North Carolina.

References

1864 births
1902 deaths
19th-century American slaves
19th-century African-American women
19th-century American physicians
19th-century American women physicians
20th-century African-American people
20th-century African-American women
African-American physicians
Physicians from Georgia (U.S. state)
American gynecologists
American obstetricians
Physicians from North Carolina
People from Mecklenburg County, North Carolina
People from Atlanta
Fisk University alumni
Woman's Medical College of Pennsylvania alumni
Burials in North Carolina
Women gynaecologists
African-American women physicians